Depha Masterpiece is a Malaysian rock musician, songwriter, arranger, and producer from Sarawak. He is best known as the lead vocalist and primary songwriter of the Bornean hard rock band, Masterpiece.

Raised in Sabah, Depha moved to Sarawak in the early 1990s, where he became active in the local hard rock scene and joined several bands, including Silent Killer and Black Monkey. In 2005, he joined Masterpiece, with whom he enjoyed great success and recognition in the late 2000s. Their first album, Merindang Ke Bintang has won numerous awards including the best produced debut album of 2009–2010 during the Dayak Music Awards 2010, in Sarawak.
Its full-length follow-ups, the second albums Rock & Roll (2013), were also widely successful; which respectively debuted at No. 1 on the Local Radio Station for months. He has since recorded another three studio albums with the band; Ngap Sayot (2014), Ngarap Ka Nuan Nikal Pulai (2016) and followed by Ensera Paragon (2018).

Depha has worked as a composer and songwriter for other artists, including Hailey Robson, Melissa Francis and Watt Rock. He is one of the most influential rock vocalist & musicians in Sarawak.

Personal life
Depha was born in Kapit, Sarawak. He learned to play the guitar at age 13, and in the late 1990s was part of a rock cover band, Black Monkey which also included future Masterpiece's member Marcus.

In 2005, Depha was recruited by Masterpiece-founder Willy Edwin and his brother Kennedy Edwin in Sibu and has since appeared on all released albums by the band, up through their latest album Ensera Paragon. He has composed and produced almost all songs for Masterpiece except "Kumang Mimpi" from Merindang Ke Bintang which is co-written by the band's present keyboardist, Roslee Qadir. He was also responsible for the acoustic intro of "Ngap Sayot".

Depha identifies Metallica as having been his main musical influence as a child, and has said they were the reason he wanted to play guitar.
He was also a fan of 70s & 80s hard rock and heavy metal bands, including White Lion, AC/DC, Iron Maiden, Queen, Black Sabbath, Deep Purple and Bon Jovi.
Masterpiece occasionally played cover songs by these bands, including Queen's "I want to break free", Bon Jovi's "It's my life," and Metallica' "Enter Sandman".
He has also cited Led Zeppelin, Nightwish, Kamelot, The Calling, Dewa 19, Nickelback and Avenged Sevenfold as important influences in his own songwriting style.

Masterpiece

Current members
 Willy Edwin – lead guitars (2003–present)
 Kennedy Edwin (Kent) – guitars, vocals, backing vocals (2003–present)
 Watt Marcus – bass (2003–present)
 Depha – lead vocals, songwriter (2005–present)
 Harold Vincent – drums (2005–present)
 Valentine Jimmy (Emek) – keyboards (Touring 2011–2012; official 2013–present)
 Roslee Kadir  – keyboards, piano, backing vocals (2011–present)

Former members
 Roni – drums (2003–2005)
 Dellender Wilson – keyboards (2005–2008)
 Timothy Umpok – keyboards (2008–2011)

Awards and achievements

Masterpiece has been recognised by several Sarawak Music Awards ceremonies; the band has received twelve awards from several nominations. Notable awards they have won include the Most Popular Group, voted by fans via SMS in 2010 Dayak Music Awards and best rock artiste in Dayak Music Awards on 2014. For their contribution and support to Sarawak music industry, they were invited to be the opening act for the Malaysian legendary rock band, Search (band) during their 30th anniversary Fenomena concert in Stadium Negeri Kuching Sarawak in December 2011.

Discography
Masterpiece

 Merindang Ke Bintang (2009)
 Rock & Roll (2013)
 Ngap Sayot (2014)
 Ngarap Ka Nuan Nikal Pulai (2016)
 Ensera Paragon (2018)

Compilations & single
 Mansau Leka Padi (2011)
 Berami Ba Ati Nuan (2014)
 Nadai Ati Berami (2015)

Other music compositions

See also
 Masterpiece

References

External links

 
 Masterpiece on Reverbnation

1980 births
Living people
People from Sarawak
Malaysian rock singers
Malaysian songwriters
Masterpiece (band) members
Iban people